Christopher II (Kharalambos Danielidis, modern Greek: Χαράλαμπος Δανιηλίδης; 17 January 1876, Madytos - 23 June 1967) served as the Greek Orthodox Patriarch of Alexandria between 1939 and 1966.

References

20th-century Greek Patriarchs of Alexandria
1876 births
1967 deaths
People from Madytos
Greeks from the Ottoman Empire